Salvador Moreno Fernández (14 October 1886 – 2 May 1966) was a Spanish admiral who served as Minister of the Navy of Spain between 1939 and 1945 and between 1951 and 1957, during the Francoist dictatorship.

References

1886 births
1966 deaths
Defence ministers of Spain
Government ministers during the Francoist dictatorship